Oleg Igorevich Aleynik (born 8 February 1989) is a Russian professional footballer.

Club career
He made his Russian Football National League debut for FC Metallurg Lipetsk on 17 August 2009 in a game against FC Sibir Novosibirsk.

He made his Russian Premier League debut for FC Rotor Volgograd on 11 August 2020 in a game against FC Zenit Saint Petersburg.

References

External links
 
 
 

1989 births
People from Gukovo
Living people
Russian footballers
Association football midfielders
FC Metallurg Lipetsk players
FC Rotor Volgograd players
FC Olimpia Volgograd players
FC Volgar Astrakhan players
FC Kuban Krasnodar players
FC Rostov players
FC SKA-Khabarovsk players
FC Ural Yekaterinburg players
FC Moscow players
FC Baltika Kaliningrad players
Russian Premier League players
FC Chayka Peschanokopskoye players
Sportspeople from Rostov Oblast